Citizen Force Party (FC) was a Mexican political party that had legal registry between 2002 and 2003, their postulates did not fit within the traditional political phantom of left or right, but that it looked for to be one more an option for the citizen policy.

Citizen Force Party participated in the 2003 elections in which did not manage to obtain 2% minimum of votes to maintain the registry, thus losing it and it disappeared as a political party.

References

Political parties established in 2002
Political parties disestablished in 2003
Defunct political parties in Mexico
2002 establishments in Mexico